Laguna Negra (Black Lagoon), also known as Laguna de los Difuntos (Lagoon of the Deceased), is an important body of water located in Rocha Department, Uruguay.

References

External links

Rocha
Landforms of Rocha Department
Birdwatching sites in Uruguay
Lagoons of South America